The 2016 FIBA Africa Women's Clubs Champions Cup (22nd edition), was an international basketball tournament that took place at the Pavilhão do Maxaquene, in Maputo, Mozambique, from November 25 to December 6, 2015. The tournament, organized by FIBA Africa and hosted by Clube Ferroviário de Maputo, was contested by 10 teams split into 2 groups, the first four of each group qualifying for the knock-out stage (quarter, semis and final).
 
The tournament was won by Primeiro de Agosto from Angola.

Draw

Squads

Preliminary rounds

Times given below are in CAT UTC+2.

Group A

Group B

Knockout stage
Championship bracket

5-8th bracket

9th place

Quarter finals

5th-8th place

Semifinals

7th place

5th place

Bronze medal game

Gold medal game

Final standings

Statistical Leaders

Individual Tournament Highs

Points

Rebounds

Assists

Steals

Blocks

Turnovers

2-point field goal percentage

3-point field goal percentage

Free throw percentage

Individual Game Highs

Team Tournament Highs

Points

Rebounds

Assists

Steals

Blocks

Turnovers

2-point field goal percentage

3-point field goal percentage

Free throw percentage

Team Game highs

All Tournament Team

See also
 2015 FIBA Africa Championship for Women

References

External links 
 Official Website1
 Official Website2
 

2016 FIBA Africa Women's Clubs Champions Cup
Women's Clubs Champions Cup
Africa Women's Clubs Champions Cup
FIBA